The Trade and Business Development Body (Ulster-Scots: Tha Mercat an Dalin Fordèrin Convenerie), trading as InterTradeIreland, (Irish: IdirThrádáilÉireann; Ulster-Scots: NifferinMercatAirlann) is one of the six all-island bodies set up following the Belfast Agreement reporting to the North/South Ministerial Council. InterTradeIreland is a Cross-Border Trade and Business Development Body funded by the Department of Enterprise, Trade and Employment (DETE) in Ireland and the Department for the Economy in Northern Ireland (DFE). InterTradeIreland helps small and medium-sized enterprises (SMEs) across the island with a wide range of services in particular to assist firms with growth, funding, capacity building and research and innovation.

Since its inception, InterTradeIreland has assisted 49,000 businesses, created/protected over 18,000 new jobs and generated £1.2bn worth of trade and business development. 
Cross-border trade is also currently sitting at £6.5bn, its highest level in 20 years.

InterTradeIreland's mission is to 'Support businesses, through our innovation and trade initiatives, to take advantage of north–south co-operative opportunities to improve capability and drive competitiveness, jobs and growth. Its two main pillars are – helping SMEs to access the opportunities that cross-border trade presents, as well as building collaborative partnerships between businesses, academia and networks in both jurisdictions to drive innovation across the island.

Board

InterTradeIreland's Current Board (as of October 2021) are:

Chair - Ken Nelson
Vice Chair - Martin McVicar
Micheál Briody
Tim Cairns
Florence Bayliss
Adrienne McGuinness
Richard Kennedy
Michael Hanley
Pete Byrne
Conor Patterson
David Simpson

 
The current Designated Officer of InterTradeIreland is Margaret Hearty (in the absence of a CEO).

Annual Reports

External links

Sales, Funding support and Advice

Innovation Supports and Services

Post-Brexit Supports and Advice

Cross-Border Insights

References

British–Irish Agreement implementation bodies